Khudynino is a rural locality (a village) in Rostilovskoye Rural Settlement, Gryazovetsky District, Vologda Oblast, Russia. The population was 4 as of 2002.

Geography 
Khudynino is located 36 km south of Gryazovets (the district's administrative centre) by road. Varaksino is the nearest rural locality.

References 

Rural localities in Gryazovetsky District